The Virgin is a 1924 American silent drama film directed by Alan James and starring Kenneth Harlan, Dorothy Revier, and Sam De Grasse. It is inspired by the poem The Virgin of San Blas by Julio Sabello.

Cast
 Kenneth Harlan as David Kent 
 Dorothy Revier as Maía Valdez 
 Sam De Grasse as Ricardo Ruiz 
 Frank Lackteen as Ricardo's Valet 
 Rosa Rosanova as The Widow Montez 
 Alice Lake as Rosa Montez 
 Walter Hiers as Sam Hawkins 
 Nell Clark Keller as The Duenna 
 Lois Scott as The Maid 
 J.P. Lockney as Major-domo 
 Cesare Gravina as The Money Lender

References

Bibliography
 Munden, Kenneth White. The American Film Institute Catalog of Motion Pictures Produced in the United States, Part 1. University of California Press, 1997.

External links

1924 films
1924 drama films
1920s English-language films
American silent feature films
Silent American drama films
Films directed by Alan James
American black-and-white films
Films set in Spain
1920s American films